Dulkadir may refer to: 
Dulkadir tribe; see Qizilbash
Beylik of Dulkadir
Dulkadir Eyalet